The DPRK Sci-Tech Complex is a science and technology centre housed in a large atom-shaped building located on Ssuk Island in Pyongyang, accessed by the Chungsong Bridge. It was completed in 2015. According to KBS World, it then had over 100,000 square meters of floor area.

From above, the facility is built to resemble an atom. The facility has an e-library. It has about 3,000 computer terminals. To North Koreans, these provide access to the national intranet, the Kwangmyong network.

See also 

 South Hamgyong Sci-Tech Library

References

Further reading

External links

  
 Virtual Tour of Sci-Tech Complex

Buildings and structures completed in 2015
Museums in Pyongyang
2015 establishments in North Korea